Kim Hyo-Gi  (born 3 July 1986) is a South Korean footballer who plays as a forward for Hwaseong FC in the K3 League.

External links 

1986 births
Living people
People from Chungju
Association football forwards
South Korean footballers
Ulsan Hyundai FC players
Ulsan Hyundai Mipo Dockyard FC players
Hwaseong FC players
FC Anyang players
Jeonbuk Hyundai Motors players
Gyeongnam FC players
Gwangju FC players
Korea National League players
K League 1 players
K League 2 players
K3 League players